The Northwest Atlantic Fisheries Organization (NAFO) is an intergovernmental organization with a mandate to provide scientific advice and management of fisheries in the northwestern part of the Atlantic Ocean.  NAFO is headquartered in Halifax, Nova Scotia, Canada.

Mandate

NAFO's overall objective is to contribute through consultation and cooperation to the optimum utilization, rational management and conservation of the fishery resources of the Convention Area.

The NAFO Convention on Future Multilateral Cooperation in the Northwest Atlantic Fisheries applies to most fishery resources of the Northwest Atlantic except salmon, tunas/marlins, whales, and sedentary species (e.g. shellfish).

In 2007 NAFO adopted an Amended Convention. It was finally ratified in May 2017 with 3/4 of the Members agreeing to it. The original objective was modernized to include an ecosystem approach to fisheries management. It now expands beyond a sustainable use of the commercial northwest Atlantic fishery resources by committing to also protect the associated marine ecosystems from adverse fisheries effects.

History
In 1950, the fishing nations who operated fleets on the continental shelf of Canada and the United States began to recognize that fishing resources were finite and sought to establish an international multinational organization to provide for cooperation in preserving fish stocks.  This organization, the International Commission for the Northwest Atlantic Fisheries, or ICNAF, was organized that year and mandated to use modern scientific methods in providing advice to member nations.

The ICNAF was supported by the "International Convention for the Northwest Atlantic Fisheries", however between 1973 and 1982 the United Nations and its member states negotiated the "Third Convention of the Law of the Sea" - one component of which, the concept of nations being allowed to declare an Exclusive Economic Zone (EEZ), was ratified and implemented in 1977.  This extension of national fisheries jurisdiction over large areas of the continental shelf in this region by Canada, the United States, Greenland and St. Pierre and Miquelon required that the ICNAF be replaced with a new convention.

In 1979 ICNAF was replaced by the Northwest Atlantic Fisheries Organization (NAFO) which was established under the "Convention on Future Multilateral Cooperation in the Northwest Atlantic Fisheries".  NAFO continues ICNAF's legacy under a mandate of providing scientific advice to member states with the premise of ensuring the conservation and management of fish stocks in the region. The NAFO mandate includes most fishery resources in the Northwest Atlantic, except salmon, tunas/marlins, whales, and sedentary species (e.g. shellfish).

NAFO regulates twelve fish species (20 stocks) and a fishing ban (moratorium) is in place for seven fish stocks belonging to five species (Atlantic cod, American plaice, witch flounder, capelin and shrimp). For many of these stocks, the fishing moratorium started more than a decade ago, however two stocks (redfish and cod) were reopened to fishing after decade-long moratoria. NAFO co-manages the pelagic redfish in Subarea 2 and Div. 1F-3K (off Greenland) with its sister organization, NEAFC.

Functions 
NAFO is implementing the Precautionary Approach that takes into account scientific uncertainties and thus allows for improved protection of the resources. Recently NAFO Adopted the MSE (Management Strategy Evaluation) for the Greenland halibut stock. This approach considers a survey-based harvest control rule (HCR) in setting the TAC. NAFO was the first regional fisheries management organization to regulate the fishery of a species (thorny skate) belonging to skates or sharks (elasmobranchs).

Management measures of NAFO (see NAFO Conservation and Enforcement Measures) are updated every year), which include Total Allowable Catches (TACs) and quotas for regulated stocks, as well as restrictions for by-catch, minimum fish size, area, and time. In addition, NAFO imposes a number of control measures on the international fishery in the NAFO Regulatory Area, for example authorization to fish, vessel and gear requirements, controlled chartering arrangements, and product labelling requirements.

NAFO also requires that fishing vessels record and communicate their catches and fishing efforts. The reliability of these records is enhanced by the Observer Program and the NAFO Vessel Monitoring System (VMS). The Observer Program requires each fishing vessel in the NAFO area to carry an independent observer on board. Under the VMS each vessel fishing in the NAFO area is equipped with a satellite monitoring device that automatically and continuously (every two hours) reports the position.

NAFO has also adopted Port State Control Measures that apply to landings or transshipments in ports of Contracting Parties by fishing vessels flying the flag of another Contracting Party. The provisions apply to landing or transshipment of fish caught in the Regulatory Area, or fish products originating from such fish, that have not been previously landed or offloaded at a port.

NAFO's joint (international) inspection and surveillance scheme include frequent and indiscriminate at-sea inspections by authorized inspectors from NAFO member states. In addition to at-sea inspections, NAFO requires obligatory port inspections. It is the duty of flag states to perform follow-up investigations and to prosecute. NAFO publishes an Annual Compliance Report.

NAFO has identified 26 areas within its Convention area as being vulnerable to bottom contact gears, and subsequently, closed the areas to bottom fishing.  These closures will be reviewed again in 2023. NAFO has also delineated existing bottom fishing areas (footprint), in response to the United Nations General Assembly (UNGA Res. 61/105, paragraph 83) request for Regional Fisheries Management Organizations to regulate bottom fisheries that cause a significant adverse impact on vulnerable marine ecosystems.

Current member states
Year joined in brackets.
 Canada (1978)
 Cuba (1978)
 European Union (1978)
 Iceland (1978)
 Norway (1978)
 Denmark; in respect of Faroe Islands and Greenland (1979)
 Japan (1980)
 Russia (1992)
 South Korea (1993)
 United States of America (1995)
 France; in respect of Saint Pierre and Miquelon (1996)
 Ukraine (1999)
 United Kingdom (2020)

Former member states

 Bulgaria (1979–2006, acceded to the EU)
 Estonia (1992–2004, acceded to the EU)
 Latvia (1992–2004, acceded to the EU)
 Lithuania (1992–2004, acceded to the EU)
 Poland (1979–2004, acceded to the EU)
 Romania (1979–2002, acceded to the EU in 2007)
 Portugal (1979–1986, acceded to the EU)
 Spain (1983–1986, acceded to the EU)
 East Germany (1978–1990, acceded to the EU following reunification of Germany)
 Soviet Union (1978–1991, succeeded by the Russian Federation)

References

External links
 

Intergovernmental organizations established by treaty
Fisheries agencies
Organizations based in Nova Scotia
Atlantic Ocean